The Samuel F. B. Morse School at 2418 Sarah Street in the South Side Flats neighborhood of Pittsburgh, Pennsylvania, was built in 1874.  It was named in honor of Samuel Morse, commonly credited as the inventor of the telegraph. Today, it is an apartment building known as "Morse Gardens".

The school originally served an area of German, Scotch-Irish, and Welsh immigrants, who floated a $66,000 bond issue in order to build the school.  
It was added to the National Register of Historic Places on September 30, 1986.

References

External links

School buildings on the National Register of Historic Places in Pennsylvania
Schools in Pittsburgh
School buildings completed in 1874
Italianate architecture in Pennsylvania
Historic American Buildings Survey in Pennsylvania
National Register of Historic Places in Pittsburgh
1874 establishments in Pennsylvania
Apartment buildings in Pittsburgh